Veganmanias are annual vegan festivals held in numerous locations around the world.

Locations 
These festivals take place in the following cities:  
 Austria: Bregenz, Graz, Innsbruck, Linz, Vienna
 Germany: Augsburg, Iserlohn, Munich, Schweinfurt, Regensburg, Rosenheim, Würzburg
 Poland: Gdańsk, Katowice, Kraków, Łódź, Lublin, Opole, Poznań, Warsaw, Wrocław.
 Switzerland: Aarau (since 2011, before 2016 in Winterthur), Gossau, St. Gallen (since 2017)
 United States: Chicago

Editions 

In 2014, the festival in Vienna built the biggest vegan fried egg.

Veganmania festivals in Switzerland have been organised by Swissveg since 2011. The 2016 edition of Veganmania Aarau attracted 5,000 visitors, making it the largest of all vegan festivals in Switzerland. Previous editions were held in Winterthur, but due to a lack of space to accommodate the attendees, the organisation chose to move the festival to Aarau. The Gossau Veganmania, also organised by Swissveg, was held first in 2017, then featuring 60 stands.

Veganmania in Poland has been more than eight major cities, with the 2019 Łódź edition attracting over 3,000 visitors. The 2020 Łódź edition had to be cancelled due to the coronavirus pandemic.

See also 
 Animal rights
 European Vegetarian Union
 International Vegetarian Union
 List of food days
 List of vegetarian festivals
 Veganism
 VeggieWorld
 World Vegan Day
 World Vegetarian Day

References

External links
 Veganmania

Vegetarianism
Veganism
Vegetarian festivals